Always Faithful  (also known as Blanche Sweet in Always Faithful) is a 1929 American Pre-Code short film produced by The Vitaphone Corporation in conjunction with Warner Bros., which distributed the film.

The film marks the sound film debut of veteran film actress Blanche Sweet who began her screen career in 1909 as a teenager working for D. W. Griffith. It is preserved at the Library of Congress who recently restored it for showing at the National Gallery of Art.

Cast
Blanche Sweet - Mrs. George W. Mason
William B. Davidson - George W. Mason
John Litel - Wayne
Charles B. Middleton

See also
Blanche Sweet filmography

References

External links
 

1929 films
American short films
American black-and-white films
Vitaphone short films
Warner Bros. short films
1929 drama films
1920s English-language films
1920s American films